Church Stretton is a civil parish in Shropshire, England.  It contains 88 listed buildings that are recorded in the National Heritage List for England.  Of these, one is listed at Grade I, the highest of the three grades, four are at Grade II*, the middle grade, and the others are at Grade II, the lowest grade.  The parish stretches along a valley between hills to the east and west.  The major settlement is the market town of Church Stretton, with the village of All Stretton to the north, and the village of Little Stretton, and the smaller settlements of Marshbrook and Minton to the south.  In the surrounding countryside are farms, and a number of farmhouses and farm buildings are listed.  In the settlements most of the listed buildings are houses, cottages and associated structures.  Also listed are churches and items in and around the churchyards, shops, public houses, two milestones and a milepost, a signal box, and two war memorials.


Key

Buildings

Notes and references

Notes

Citations

Sources

Lists of buildings and structures in Shropshire
Listed